Lunenburg West is a provincial electoral district in Nova Scotia, Canada, that elects one member of the Nova Scotia House of Assembly. It was created in 1956 from the riding of Lunenburg County.

The riding includes the town of Bridgewater, LaHave, and Hebbville.

Geography
Lunenburg West has  of landmass.

Members of the Legislative Assembly
This riding has elected the following Members of the Legislative Assembly:

Election results

1956 general election

1960 general election

1963 general election

1967 general election

1970 general election

1974 general election

1978 general election

1981 general election

1984 general election

1988 general election

1993 general election

1998 general election

1999 general election

2003 general election

2006 general election

2009 general election

2013 general election

|-
 
|Liberal
|Mark Furey
|align="right"|3,931 
|align="right"|43.10
|align="right"|
|-
 
|New Democratic Party
|Gary Ramey
|align="right"|2,885 
|align="right"|31.00
|align="right"|
|-
 
|Progressive Conservative
|David Mitchell
|align="right"|2,143 
|align="right"|23.50
|align="right"|
|}

2017 general election

2021 general election

References

External links
 CBC riding profile (2003)

Nova Scotia provincial electoral districts
Bridgewater, Nova Scotia